Zhenluoying Town is a town situated on the northern end of Pinggu District, Beijing, China. It is surrounded by mountains on all sides except the west. The town is located to the south of Dachengzi Town, west of Erdaohezi Town, north of Huangsongyu and Xiong'erzhai Townships, and east of Dahuashan Town. As of 2020, it had 7,610 people residing within its borders. 

The origin of its name can be traced back to 1544, when Ming dynasty defeated and captured a group of Doyan raiders from Northern Yuan. The captured Mongols were kept in a garrison in this region, which was named Zhenluying. The name later evolved into Zhenluoying of today during the Qing dynasty.

History

Administrative divisions 
So far in 2021, Zhenluoying Town consists of 20 villages, all of which are listed in the table below:

See also 

 List of township-level divisions of Beijing

References 

Pinggu District
Towns in Beijing